Mirco Cenci (born 8 October 1957) is an Italian sports shooter. He competed in the men's double trap event at the 1996 Summer Olympics.

References

External links
 

1957 births
Living people
Italian male sport shooters
Olympic shooters of Italy
Shooters at the 1996 Summer Olympics
Sportspeople from Perugia